Thales of Miletus was a Greek mathematician, astronomer, statesman, and pre-Socratic philosopher from Miletus in Ionia, Asia Minor. He was one of the Seven Sages of Greece. Many, most notably Aristotle, regarded him as the first philosopher in the Greek tradition, and he is otherwise historically recognized as the first individual known to have entertained and engaged in scientific philosophy. He is often referred to as the Father of Science.  

Thales is recognized for breaking from the use of mythology to explain the world and the universe, instead explaining natural objects and phenomena by offering naturalistic theories and hypotheses. Almost all the other pre-Socratic philosophers followed him in explaining nature as deriving from a unity of everything based on the existence of a single ultimate substance instead of using mythological explanations. Aristotle regarded him as the founder of the Ionian School of philosophy and reported Thales' hypothesis that the originating principle of nature and the nature of matter was a single material substance: water.

In mathematics, Thales used geometry to calculate the heights of pyramids and the distance of ships from the shore. He is the first known individual to use deductive reasoning applied to geometry by deriving four corollaries to Thales' theorem. He is also the first known to whom a mathematical discovery has been attributed.

Life

The dates of Thales' life are not exactly known, but are roughly established by a few datable events mentioned in the sources. According to Herodotus, Thales predicted the solar eclipse of 28 May 585 BC. Diogenes Laërtius quotes the chronicle of Apollodorus of Athens as saying that Thales died at the age of 78 during the 58th Olympiad (548–545 BC) and attributes his death to heat stroke and thirst while watching the games. Thales was probably born in the city of Miletus around the mid-620s BC. The ancient writer Apollodorus of Athens writing during the 2nd century BC, thought Thales was born about the year 625 BC.

Ancestry and family 
Herodotus, writing in the 5th century BC, described Thales as "a Phoenician by remote descent". The later historian Diogenes Laërtius, in his third century AD Lives of the Philosophers, references Herodotus, Duris, and Democritus, who all agree "that Thales was the son of Examyas and Cleobulina, and belonged to the Thelidae who are Phoenicians and amongst the noblest descendants of Cadmus and Agenor" who had been banished from Phoenicia and that Thales was enrolled as a citizen in Miletus along with Neleus. Friedrich Nietzsche interprets this as meaning "only that his forefathers belonged to the seafaring people of Cadmus". However, Diogenes Laërtius then reports of a conflicting account, stating that: "Most writers, however, represent him as a genuine Milesian and of a distinguished family". In addition, his supposed mother, Cleobulina, has also been described as his companion instead of his mother. The probability is that Thales was as Greek as most Milesians. It is possible that he was of mixed ancestry as his ancestors were likely Cadmeians from Boeotia coupled with the fact of his father having a Carian name. Encyclopedia Britannica (1952) concluded that Thales was most likely a native Milesian of noble birth and that he was certainly a Greek. 

Diogenes continues, by delivering more conflicting reports: one that Thales married and either fathered a son (Cybisthus or Cybisthon) or adopted his nephew of the same name; the second that he never married, telling his mother as a young man that it was too early to marry, and as an older man that it was too late. Plutarch had earlier told this version: Solon visited Thales and asked him why he remained single; Thales answered that he did not like the idea of having to worry about children. Nevertheless, several years later, anxious for family, he adopted his nephew Cybisthus.

Travels 
Some assume that Thales, at one point in his life, visited Egypt, where he learned about geometry. It is not impossible that Thales visited Egypt, since Miletus had a permanent colony there (namely Naucratis), however visits to Egypt were a commonplace attribution to various philosophers by later writers, especially when these writers tried to explain mathematical knowledge. However, Thales may have known about Egypt from accounts of others, without actually visiting it. There is no strong evidence that Thales ever visited countries in the Near East.

Activities 
Thales (who was born about 50 years before Pythagoras and 300 years before Euclid) is often hailed as "the first Greek mathematician". While some historians, such as Colin R. Fletcher, point out that there could have been a predecessor to Thales who would have been named in Eudemus' lost book History of Geometry, it is admitted that without the work "the question becomes mere speculation." Fletcher holds that as there is no viable predecessor to the title of first Greek mathematician, the only question is whether Thales qualifies as a practitioner in that field; he holds that "Thales had at his command the techniques of observation, experimentation, superposition and deduction...he has proved himself mathematician."

Aristotle wrote in Metaphysics, "Thales, the founder of this school of philosophy, says the permanent entity is water (which is why he also propounded that the earth floats on water). Presumably he derived this assumption from seeing that the nutriment of everything is moist, and that heat itself is generated from moisture and depends upon it for its existence (and that from which a thing is generated is always its first principle). He derived his assumption from this; and also from the fact that the seeds of everything have a moist nature, whereas water is the first principle of the nature of moist things."

Thales involved himself in many activities, including engineering. Some say that he left no writings. Others say that he wrote On the Solstice and On the Equinox. The Nautical Star-guide has been attributed to him, but this was disputed in ancient times. No writing attributed to him has survived. Diogenes Laërtius quotes two letters from Thales: one to Pherecydes of Syros, offering to review his book on religion, and one to Solon, offering to keep him company on his sojourn from Athens.

Olive story as example of option type trade

A story, with different versions, recounts how Thales achieved riches from an olive harvest by prediction of the weather. In one version, he bought all the olive presses in Miletus after predicting the weather and a good harvest for a particular year. Another version of the story has Aristotle explain that Thales had reserved presses in advance, at a discount, and could rent them out at a high price when demand peaked, following his prediction of a particularly good harvest. This first version of the story would constitute the first historically known creation and use of futures, whereas the second version would be the first historically known creation and use of options.

Aristotle explains that Thales' objective in doing this was not to enrich himself but to prove to his fellow Milesians that philosophy could be useful, contrary to what they thought, or alternatively, Thales had made his foray into enterprise because of a personal challenge put to him by an individual who had asked why, if Thales was an intelligent famous philosopher, he had yet to attain wealth.

Advisor role
Diogenes Laërtius tells us that Thales gained fame as a counselor when he advised the Milesians not to engage in a symmachia, a "fighting together", with the Lydians. This has sometimes been interpreted as an alliance. Another story by Herodotus is that Croesus sent his army to the Persian territory. He was stopped by the river Halys, then unbridged. Thales then got the army across the river by digging a diversion upstream so as to reduce the flow, making it possible to cross the river. While Herodotus reported that most of his fellow Greeks believe that Thales did divert the river Halys to assist King Croesus' military endeavors, he himself finds it doubtful.

Croesus was defeated before the city of Sardis by Cyrus, who subsequently spared Miletus because it had taken no action. Cyrus was so impressed by Croesus’ wisdom and his connection with the sages that he spared him and took his advice on various matters. The Ionian cities should be demoi, or "districts". 

Miletus, however, received favorable terms from Cyrus. The others remained in an Ionian League of twelve cities (excluding Miletus), and were subjugated by the Persians.

Astronomy 

According to Herodotus, Thales predicted the solar eclipse of 28 May 585 BC. Thales also described the position of Ursa Minor, and he thought the constellation might be useful as a guide for navigation at sea. He calculated the duration of the year and the timings of the equinoxes and solstices. He is additionally attributed with the first observation of the Hyades and with calculating the position of the Pleiades. Plutarch indicates that in his day (c. AD 100) there was an extant work, the Astronomy, composed in verse and attributed to Thales.

Herodotus writes that in the sixth year of the war, the Lydians under King Alyattes and the Medes under Cyaxares were engaged in an indecisive battle when suddenly day turned into night, leading to both parties halting the fighting and negotiating a peace agreement. Herodotus also mentions that the loss of daylight had been predicted by Thales. He does not, however, mention the location of the battle.

However, based on the list of Median kings and the duration of their reign reported elsewhere by Herodotus, Cyaxares died 10 years before the eclipse.

Sagacity

Diogenes Laërtius tells us that the Seven Sages were created in the archonship of Damasius at Athens about 582 BC and that Thales was the first sage. The same story, however, asserts that Thales emigrated to Miletus. There is also a report that he did not become a student of nature until after his political career. Much as we would like to have a date on the seven sages, we must reject these stories and the tempting date if we are to believe that Thales was a native of Miletus, predicted the eclipse, and was with Croesus in the campaign against Cyrus.

Thales was said to have had close contacts with priests of Thebes and instructed them in geometry.

In Diogenes Laërtius' Lives of Eminent Philosophers Chapter 1.39, Laërtius relates several stories of an expensive object that is to go to the most wise. In one version (that Laërtius credits to Callimachus in his Iambics) Bathycles of Arcadia states in his will that an expensive bowl "'should be given to him who had done most good by his wisdom.' So it was given to Thales, went the round of all the sages, and came back to Thales again. And he sent it to Apollo at Didyma, with this dedication...'Thales the Milesian, son of Examyas [dedicates this] to Delphinian Apollo after twice winning the prize from all the Greeks.'"

Theories 
Early Greeks, and other civilizations before them, often invoked idiosyncratic explanations of natural phenomena with reference to the will of anthropomorphic gods and heroes. Instead, Thales aimed to explain natural phenomena via rational hypotheses that referenced natural processes themselves. For example, rather than assuming that earthquakes were the result of supernatural whims, Thales explained them by hypothesizing that the Earth floats on water and that earthquakes occur when the Earth is rocked by waves.

Thales was a hylozoist (one who thinks that matter is alive, i.e. containing soul(s)). Aristotle wrote (De Anima 411 a7-8) of Thales: ...Thales thought all things are full of gods. According to Aristotle, Thales of Miletus understood the soul as something capable of movement when he said that “the magnet has a soul because it moves iron” Aristotle (De Anima 405 20-22). 

Thales, according to Aristotle, asked what was the nature (Greek arche) of the object so that it would behave in its characteristic way. Physis comes from phyein, "to grow", related to our word "be". (G)natura is the way a thing is "born", again with the stamp of what it is in itself.

Aristotle characterizes most of the philosophers "at first" as thinking that the "principles in the form of matter were the only principles of all things", where "principle" is arche, "matter" is hyle ("wood" or "matter", "material") and "form" is eidos.

Arche is translated as "principle", but the two words do not have precisely the same meaning. A principle of something is merely prior (related to pro-) to it either chronologically or logically. If the arche is taken to be an origin, then specific causality is implied; that is, B is supposed to be characteristically B just because it comes from A, which dominates it.

The archai that Aristotle had in mind in his well-known passage on the first Greek scientists are not necessarily chronologically prior to their objects, but are constituents of it. For example, in pluralism objects are composed of earth, air, fire and water, but those elements do not disappear with the production of the object. They remain as archai within it, as do the atoms of the atomists.

What Aristotle is really saying is that the first philosophers were trying to define the substance(s) of which all material objects are composed. As a matter of fact, that is exactly what modern scientists are attempting to accomplish in nuclear physics, which is a second reason why Thales is described as the first western scientist, but some contemporary scholars reject this interpretation.

Geometry
Thales was known for his theoretical and practical use of geometry, and is often considered the first person in the western world to have applied deductive reasoning to geometry (and by extension is often considered the first western mathematician). His understanding was theoretical as well as practical. For example, he said:

Thales understood similar triangles and right triangles, and what is more, used that knowledge in practical ways. The story is told in Diogenes Laërtius (loc. cit.) that he measured the height of the pyramids by their shadows at the moment when his own shadow was equal to his height. A right triangle with two equal legs is a 45-degree right triangle, all of which are similar. The length of the pyramid's shadow measured from the center of the pyramid at that moment must have been equal to its height.

This story indicates that he was familiar with the Egyptian seked, or seqed, the ratio of the run to the rise of a slope (cotangent). The seked is at the base of problems 56, 57, 58, 59 and 60 of the Rhind papyrus — an ancient Egyptian mathematical document.

More practically Thales used the same method to measure the distances of ships at sea, said Eudemus as reported by Proclus ("in Euclidem"). According to Kirk & Raven, all you need for this feat is three straight sticks pinned at one end and knowledge of your altitude. One stick goes vertically into the ground. A second is made level. With the third you sight the ship and calculate the seked from the height of the stick and its distance from the point of insertion to the line of sight (Proclus, In Euclidem, 352).

Thales' theorems

There are two theorems of Thales in elementary geometry, one known as Thales' theorem having to do with a triangle inscribed in a circle and having the circle's diameter as one leg, the other theorem being also called the intercept theorem. In addition Eudemus attributed to him the discovery that a circle is bisected by its diameter, that the base angles of an isosceles triangle are equal and that vertical angles are equal. According to a historical Note, when Thales visited Egypt, he observed that whenever the Egyptians drew two intersecting lines, they would measure the vertical angles to make sure that they were equal. Thales concluded that one could prove that all vertical angles are equal if one accepted some general notions such as: all straight angles are equal, equals added to equals are equal, and equals subtracted from equals are equal.

The evidence for the primacy of Thales comes to us from a book by Proclus who wrote a thousand years after Thales but is believed to have had a copy of Eudemus' book. Proclus wrote "Thales was the first to go to Egypt and bring back to Greece this study." He goes on to tell us that in addition to applying the knowledge he gained in Egypt "He himself discovered many propositions and disclosed the underlying principles of many others to his successors, in some case his method being more general, in others more empirical."

Other quotes from Proclus list more of Thales' mathematical achievements:

In addition to Proclus, Hieronymus of Rhodes also cites Thales as the first Greek mathematician. Hieronymus held that Thales was able to measure the height of the pyramids by using a theorem of geometry now known as the intercept theorem, (after gathering data by using his walking-stick and comparing its shadow to those cast by the pyramids). We receive variations of Hieronymus' story through Diogenes Laërtius, Pliny the Elder, and Plutarch. According to Hieronymus, historically quoted by Diogenes Laërtius, Thales found the height of pyramids by comparison between the lengths of the shadows cast by a person and by the pyramids.

Due to the variations among testimonies, such as the "story of the sacrifice of an ox on the occasion of the discovery that the angle on a diameter of a circle is a right angle" in the version told by Diogenes Laërtius being accredited to Pythagoras rather than Thales, some historians (such as D. R. Dicks) question whether such anecdotes have any historical worth whatsoever.

Water as a first principle
Thales' most famous philosophical position was his cosmological thesis, which comes down to us through a passage from Aristotle's Metaphysics. In the work Aristotle unequivocally reported Thales' hypothesis about the nature of all matter – that the originating principle of nature was a single material substance: water. Aristotle then proceeded to proffer a number of conjectures based on his own observations to lend some credence to why Thales may have advanced this idea (though Aristotle did not hold it himself).

Aristotle laid out his own thinking about matter and form which may shed some light on the ideas of Thales, in Metaphysics 983 b6 8–11, 17–21. (The passage contains words that were later adopted by science with quite different meanings.)

In this quote we see Aristotle's depiction of the problem of change and the definition of substance. He asked if an object changes, is it the same or different? In either case how can there be a change from one to the other? The answer is that the substance "is saved", but acquires or loses different qualities (the things you "experience").

Aristotle conjectured that Thales reached his conclusion by contemplating that the "nourishment of all things is moist and that even the hot is created from the wet and lives by it." While Aristotle's conjecture on why Thales held water as the originating principle of matter is his own thinking, his statement that Thales held it as water is generally accepted as genuinely originating with Thales and he is seen as an incipient matter-and-formist.

Thales thought the Earth must be a flat disk which is floating in an expanse of water.

Heraclitus Homericus states that Thales drew his conclusion from seeing moist substance turn into air, slime and earth. It seems likely that Thales viewed the Earth as solidifying from the water on which it floated and the oceans that surround it.

Writing centuries later, Diogenes Laërtius also states that Thales taught "Water constituted ('stood under') the principle of all things."

Aristotle considered Thales’ position to be roughly the equivalent to the later ideas of Anaximenes, who held that everything was composed of air.
The 1870 book Dictionary of Greek and Roman Biography and Mythology noted:

Beliefs in divinity

According to Aristotle, Thales thought lodestones had souls, because iron is attracted to them (by the force of magnetism).

Aristotle defined the soul as the principle of life, that which imbues the matter and makes it live, giving it the animation, or power to act. The idea did not originate with him, as the Greeks in general believed in the distinction between mind and matter, which was ultimately to lead to a distinction not only between body and soul but also between matter and energy. If things were alive, they must have souls. This belief was no innovation, as the ordinary ancient populations of the Mediterranean did believe that natural actions were caused by divinities. Accordingly, Aristotle and other ancient writers state that Thales believed that "all things were full of gods." In their zeal to make him the first in everything some said he was the first to hold the belief, which must have been widely known to be false. However, Thales was looking for something more general, a universal substance of mind. That also was in the polytheism of the times. Zeus was the very personification of supreme mind, dominating all the subordinate manifestations. From Thales on, however, philosophers had a tendency to depersonify or objectify mind, as though it were the substance of animation per se and not actually a god like the other gods. The result was a total removal of mind from substance, opening the door to a non-divine principle of action.

Classical thought, however, had proceeded only a little way along that path. Instead of referring to the person, Zeus, they talked about the great mind:

The universal mind appears as a Roman belief in Virgil as well:

According to Henry Fielding (1775), Diogenes Laërtius (1.35) affirmed that Thales posed "the independent pre-existence of God from all eternity, stating "that God was the oldest of all beings, for he existed without a previous cause even in the way of generation; that the world was the most beautiful of all things; for it was created by God."

Influences

Due to the scarcity of sources concerning Thales and the discrepancies between the accounts given in the sources that have survived, there is a scholarly debate over the possible influences of Thales and the Greek mathematicians that came after him.
Historian Roger L. Cooke points out that Proclus does not make any mention of Mesopotamian influence on Thales or Greek geometry, but "is shown clearly in Greek astronomy, in the use of sexagesimal system of measuring angles and in Ptolemy's explicit use of Mesopotamian astronomical observations." Cooke notes that it may possibly also appear in the second book of Euclid's Elements, "which contains geometric constructions equivalent to certain algebraic relations that are frequently encountered in the cuneiform tablets." Cooke notes "This relation, however, is controversial."

Historian B.L. Van der Waerden is among those advocating the idea of Mesopotamian influence, writing "It follows that we have to abandon the traditional belief that the oldest Greek mathematicians discovered geometry entirely by themselves...a belief that was tenable only as long as nothing was known about Babylonian mathematics. This in no way diminishes the stature of Thales; on the contrary, his genius receives only now the honour that is due to it, the honour of having developed a logical structure for geometry, of having introduced proof into geometry."

Some historians, such as D. R. Dicks takes issue with the idea that we can determine from the questionable sources we have, just how influenced Thales was by Babylonian sources. He points out that while Thales is held to have been able to calculate an eclipse using a cycle called the "Saros" held to have been "borrowed from the Babylonians", "The Babylonians, however, did not use cycles to predict solar eclipses, but computed them from observations of the latitude of the moon made shortly before the expected syzygy." Dicks cites historian O. Neugebauer who relates that "No Babylonian theory for predicting solar eclipse existed at 600 B.C., as one can see from the very unsatisfactory situation 400 years later; nor did the Babylonians ever develop any theory which took the influence of geographical latitude into account." Dicks examines the cycle referred to as 'Saros' – which Thales is held to have used and which is believed to stem from the Babylonians. He points out that Ptolemy makes use of this and another cycle in his book Mathematical Syntaxis but attributes it to Greek astronomers earlier than Hipparchus and not to Babylonians. Dicks notes Herodotus does relate that Thales made use of a cycle to predict the eclipse, but maintains that "if so, the fulfillment of the 'prediction' was a stroke of pure luck not science". He goes further joining with other historians (F. Martini, J.L. E. Dreyer, O. Neugebauer) in rejecting the historicity of the eclipse story altogether. Dicks links the story of Thales discovering the cause for a solar eclipse with Herodotus' claim that Thales discovered the cycle of the sun with relation to the solstices, and concludes "he could not possibly have possessed this knowledge which neither the Egyptians nor the Babylonians nor his immediate successors possessed." Josephus is the only ancient historian that claims Thales visited Babylonia.

Herodotus wrote that the Greeks learnt the practice of dividing the day into 12 parts, about the polos, and the gnomon from the Babylonians. (The exact meaning of his use of the word polos is unknown, current theories include: "the heavenly dome", "the tip of the axis of the celestial sphere", or a spherical concave sundial.) Yet even Herodotus' claims on Babylonian influence are contested by some modern historians, such as L. Zhmud, who points out that the division of the day into twelve parts (and by analogy the year) was known to the Egyptians already in the second millennium, the gnomon was known to both Egyptians and Babylonians, and the idea of the "heavenly sphere" was not used outside of Greece at this time.

Less controversial than the position that Thales learnt Babylonian mathematics is the claim he was influenced by Egyptians. Pointedly historian S. N. Bychkov holds that the idea that the base angles of an isosceles triangle are equal likely came from Egypt. This is because, when building a roof for a home – having a cross section be exactly an isosceles triangle isn't crucial (as it's the ridge of the roof that must fit precisely), in contrast a symmetric square pyramid cannot have errors in the base angles of the faces or they will not fit together tightly.
Historian D.R. Dicks agrees that compared to the Greeks in the era of Thales, there was a more advanced state of mathematics among the Babylonians and especially the Egyptians – "both cultures knew the correct formulae for determining the areas and volumes of simple geometrical figures such as triangles, rectangles, trapezoids, etc.; the Egyptians could also calculate correctly the volume of the frustum of a pyramid with a square base (the Babylonians used an incorrect formula for this), and used a formula for the area of a circle...which gives a value for π of 3.1605—a good approximation." Dicks also agrees that this would have had an effect on Thales (whom the most ancient sources agree was interested in mathematics and astronomy) but he holds that tales of Thales' travels in these lands are pure myth.

The ancient civilization and massive monuments of Egypt had "a profound and ineradicable impression on the Greeks". They attributed to Egyptians "an immemorial knowledge of certain subjects" (including geometry) and would claim Egyptian origin for some of their own ideas to try and lend them "a respectable antiquity" (such as the "Hermetic" literature of the Alexandrian period).

Dicks holds that since Thales was a prominent figure in Greek history by the time of Eudemus but "nothing certain was known except that he lived in Miletus". A tradition developed that as "Milesians were in a position to be able to travel widely" Thales must have gone to Egypt. As Herodotus says Egypt was the birthplace of geometry he must have learnt that while there. Since he had to have been there, surely one of the theories on Nile Flooding laid out by Herodotus must have come from Thales. Likewise as he must have been in Egypt he had to have done something with the Pyramids – thus the tale of measuring them. Similar apocryphal stories exist of Pythagoras and Plato traveling to Egypt with no corroborating evidence.

As the Egyptian and Babylonian geometry at the time was "essentially arithmetical", they used actual numbers and "the procedure is then described with explicit instructions as to what to do with these numbers" there was no mention of how the rules of procedure were made, and nothing toward a logically arranged corpus of generalized geometrical knowledge with analytical 'proofs' such as we find in the words of Euclid, Archimedes, and Apollonius." So even had Thales traveled there he could not have learnt anything about the theorems he is held to have picked up there (especially because there is no evidence that any Greeks of this age could use Egyptian hieroglyphics).

Likewise until around the second century BC and the time of Hipparchus (c. 190–120 BC) the Babylonian general division of the circle into 360 degrees and their sexagesimal system was unknown. Herodotus says almost nothing about Babylonian literature and science, and very little about their history. Some historians, like P. Schnabel, hold that the Greeks only learned more about Babylonian culture from Berossus, a Babylonian priest who is said to have set up a school in Cos around 270 BC (but to what extent this had in the field of geometry is contested).

Dicks points out that the primitive state of Greek mathematics and astronomical ideas exhibited by the peculiar notions of Thales' successors (such as Anaximander, Anaximenes, Xenophanes, and Heraclitus), which historian J. L. Heiberg calls "a mixture of brilliant intuition and childlike analogies", argues against the assertions from writers in late antiquity that Thales discovered and taught advanced concepts in these fields.

John Burnet (1892) noted

According to the 10th-century Byzantine encyclopedia Suda, Thales had been the "teacher and kineman" of Anaximander.

Nicholas Molinari has recently argued for an important Greek influence on Thales' idea of the archai, namely, the archaic water deity Acheloios, who was equated with water and worshipped in Miletos during Thales' life.  He argues that Thales, as a sage and world traveler, was exposed to many mythologies and religions, and while they all had some influence, his hometown Acheloios was the most essential. For evidence, he points to the fact that hydor meant specifically "fresh water," and that Acheloios was seen as a shape-shifter in myth and art, so able to become anything. He also points out that the rivers of the world were seen as the "sinews of Acheloios" in antiquity, and this multiplicity of deities is reflected in Thales' idea that "all things are full of gods."

Interpretations 
In the long sojourn of philosophy, there has existed hardly a philosopher or historian of philosophy who did not mention Thales and try to characterize him in some way. He is generally recognized as having brought something new to human thought. Mathematics, astronomy, and medicine already existed. Thales added something to these different collections of knowledge to produce a universality, which, as far as writing tells us, was not in tradition before, but resulted in a new field.

Ever since, interested persons have been asking what that new something is. Answers fall into (at least) two categories, the theory and the method. Once an answer has been arrived at, the next logical step is to ask how Thales compares to other philosophers, which leads to his classification (rightly or wrongly).

Theory
The most natural epithets of Thales are "materialist" and "naturalist", which are based on ousia and physis. The Catholic Encyclopedia notes that Aristotle called him a physiologist, with the meaning "student of nature." On the other hand, he would have qualified as an early physicist, as did Aristotle. They studied corpora, "bodies", the medieval descendants of substances.

Russell
Most agree that Thales' stamp on thought is the unity of substance, hence Bertrand Russell:

Russell was only reflecting an established tradition; for example: Nietzsche, in his Philosophy in the Tragic Age of the Greeks, wrote:

This sort of materialism, however, should not be confused with deterministic materialism. Thales was only trying to explain the unity observed in the free play of the qualities. The arrival of uncertainty in the modern world made possible a return to Thales; for example, John Elof Boodin writes ("God and Creation"):

Boodin
Boodin defines an "emergent" materialism, in which the objects of sense emerge uncertainly from the substrate. Thales is the innovator of this sort of materialism.

Feldman
Later scholastic thinkers would maintain that in his choice of water Thales was influenced by Babylonian or Chaldean religion, that held that a god had begun creation by acting upon the pre-existing water. Historian Abraham Feldman holds this does not stand up under closer examination. In Babylonian religion the water is lifeless and sterile until a god acts upon it, but for Thales water itself was divine and creative. He maintained that "All things are full of gods", and to understand the nature of things was to discover the secrets of the deities, and through this knowledge open the possibility that one could be greater than the grandest Olympian.

Feldman points out that while other thinkers recognized the wetness of the world "none of them was inspired to conclude that everything was ultimately aquatic." He further points out that Thales was "a wealthy citizen of the fabulously rich Oriental port of Miletus...a dealer in the staples of antiquity, wine and oil...He certainly handled the shell-fish of the Phoenicians that secreted the dye of imperial purple." Feldman recalls the stories of Thales measuring the distance of boats in the harbor, creating mechanical improvements for ship navigation, giving an explanation for the flooding of the Nile (vital to Egyptian agriculture and Greek trade), and changing the course of the river Halys so an army could ford it. Rather than seeing water as a barrier Thales contemplated the Ionian yearly religious gathering for athletic ritual (held on the promontory of Mycale and believed to be ordained by the ancestral kindred of Poseidon, the god of the sea). He called for the Ionian mercantile states participating in this ritual to convert it into a democratic federation under the protection of Poseidon that would hold off the forces of pastoral Persia. Feldman concludes that Thales saw "that water was a revolutionary leveler and the elemental factor determining the subsistence and business of the world" and "the common channel of states."

Feldman considers Thales' environment and holds that Thales would have seen tears, sweat, and blood as granting value to a person's work and the means how life giving commodities travelled (whether on bodies of water or through the sweat of slaves and pack-animals). He would have seen that minerals could be processed from water such as life-sustaining salt and gold taken from rivers. He would’ve seen fish and other food stuffs gathered from it. Feldman points out that Thales held that the lodestone was alive as it drew metals to itself. He holds that Thales "living ever in sight of his beloved sea" would see water seem to draw all "traffic in wine and oil, milk and honey, juices and dyes" to itself, leading him to "a vision of the universe melting into a single substance that was valueless in itself and still the source of wealth." Feldman concludes that for Thales "...water united all things. The social significance of water in the time of Thales induced him to discern through hardware and dry-goods, through soil and sperm, blood, sweat and tears, one fundamental fluid stuff...water, the most commonplace and powerful material known to him." This combined with his contemporary's idea of "spontaneous generation" allow us to see how Thales could hold that water could be divine and creative.

Feldman points to the lasting association of the theory that "all whatness is wetness" with Thales himself, pointing out that Diogenes Laërtius speaks of a poem, probably a satire, where Thales is snatched to heaven by the sun.

Rise of theoretical inquiry
In the West, Thales represents a new kind of inquiring community as well. Edmund Husserl attempts to capture the new movement as follows. Philosophical man is a "new cultural configuration" based in stepping back from "pregiven tradition" and taking up a rational "inquiry into what is true in itself;" that is, an ideal of truth. It begins with isolated individuals such as Thales, but they are supported and cooperated with as time goes on. Finally the ideal transforms the norms of society, leaping across national borders.

Classification
The term "Pre-Socratic" derives ultimately from the philosopher Aristotle, who distinguished the early philosophers as concerning themselves with substance.

Diogenes Laërtius on the other hand took a strictly geographic and ethnic approach. Philosophers were either Ionian or Italian. He used "Ionian" in a broader sense, including also the Athenian academics, who were not Pre-Socratics. From a philosophic point of view, any grouping at all would have been just as effective. There is no basis for an Ionian or Italian unity. Some scholars, however, concede to Diogenes' scheme as far as referring to an "Ionian" school. There was no such school in any sense.

The most popular approach refers to a Milesian school, which is more justifiable socially and philosophically. They sought for the substance of phenomena and may have studied with each other. Some ancient writers qualify them as Milesioi, "of Miletus."

Influence on others

Thales had a profound influence on other Greek thinkers and therefore on Western history. Some  believe Anaximander was a pupil of Thales. Early sources report that one of Anaximander's more famous pupils, Pythagoras, visited Thales as a young man, and that Thales advised him to travel to Egypt to further his philosophical and mathematical studies.

Many philosophers followed Thales' lead in searching for explanations in nature rather than in the supernatural; others returned to supernatural explanations, but couched them in the language of philosophy rather than of myth or of religion.

Looking specifically at Thales' influence during the pre-Socratic era, it is clear that he stood out as one of the first thinkers who thought more in the way of logos than mythos. The difference between these two more profound ways of seeing the world is that mythos is concentrated around the stories of holy origin, while logos is concentrated around the argumentation. When the mythical man wants to explain the world the way he sees it, he explains it based on gods and powers. Mythical thought does not differentiate between things and persons and furthermore it does not differentiate between nature and culture. The way a logos thinker would present a world view is radically different from the way of the mythical thinker. In its concrete form, logos is a way of thinking not only about individualism, but also the abstract. Furthermore, it focuses on sensible and continuous argumentation. This lays the foundation of philosophy and its way of explaining the world in terms of abstract argumentation, and not in the way of gods and mythical stories.

Reliability of sources

Because of Thales' elevated status in Greek culture, an intense interest and admiration followed his reputation. Due to this following, the oral stories about his life were open to amplification and historical fabrication, even before they were written down generations later. Most modern dissension comes from trying to interpret what we know, in particular, distinguishing legend from fact.

Chronological classification
Historian D.R. Dicks and other historians divide the ancient sources about Thales into those before 320 BC and those after that year (including some such as Proclus writing in the 5th century C.E. and Simplicius of Cilicia in the 6th century C.E., who wrote nearly a millennium after his era). The first category includes Herodotus, Plato, Aristotle, Aristophanes, and Theophrastus among others. The second category includes Plautus, Aetius, Eusebius, Plutarch, Josephus, Iamblichus, Diogenes Laërtius, Theon of Smyrna, Apuleius, Clement of Alexandria, Pliny the Elder, and John Tzetzes among others.

Earliest sources
The earliest sources on Thales (living before 320 BC) are often the same for the other Milesian philosophers (Anaximander, and Anaximenes). These sources were either roughly contemporaneous (such as Herodotus) or lived within a few hundred years of his passing. Moreover, they were writing from an oral tradition that was widespread and well known in the Greece of their day.

Latter sources
The latter sources on Thales are several "ascriptions of commentators and compilers who lived anything from 700 to 1,000 years after his death" which include "anecdotes of varying degrees of plausibility" and in the opinion of some historians (such as D. R. Dicks) of "no historical worth whatsoever". Dicks points out that there is no agreement "among the 'authorities' even on the most fundamental facts of his life—e.g. whether he was a Milesian or a Phoenician, whether he left any writings or not, whether he was married or single—much less on the actual ideas and achievements with which he is credited."

Comparison of the two source groups
Contrasting the work of the more ancient writers with those of the later, Dicks points out that in the works of the early writers Thales and the other men who would be hailed as "the Seven Sages of Greece" had a different reputation than that which would be assigned to them by later authors. Closer to their own era, Thales, Solon, Bias of Priene, Pittacus of Mytilene and others were hailed as "essentially practical men who played leading roles in the affairs of their respective states, and were far better known to the earlier Greeks as lawgivers and statesmen than as profound thinkers and philosophers." For example, Plato praises him (coupled with Anacharsis) for being the originator of the potter's wheel and the anchor.

Only in the writings of the second group of writers (working after 320 BC) do "we obtain the picture of Thales as the pioneer in Greek scientific thinking, particularly in regard to mathematics and astronomy which he is supposed to have learnt about in Babylonia and Egypt." Rather than "the earlier tradition [where] he is a favourite example of the intelligent man who possesses some technical 'know how'...the later doxographers [such as Dicaearchus in the latter half of the fourth century BC] foist on to him any number of discoveries and achievements, in order to build him up as a figure of superhuman wisdom."

Problem suggested by Dicks
Dicks points out a further problem arises in the surviving information on Thales, for rather than using ancient sources closer to the era of Thales, the authors in later antiquity ("epitomators, excerptors, and compilers") actually "preferred to use one or more intermediaries, so that what we actually read in them comes to us not even at second, but at third or fourth or fifth hand. Obviously, this use of intermediate sources, copied and recopied from century to century, with each writer adding additional pieces of information of greater or less plausibility from his own knowledge, provided a fertile field for errors in transmission, wrong ascriptions, and fictitious attributions". Dicks points out that "certain doctrines that later commentators invented for Thales...were then accepted into the biographical tradition" being copied by subsequent writers who were then cited by those coming after them "and thus, because they may be repeated by different authors relying on different sources, may produce an illusory impression of genuineness."

Aristotle
Doubts even exist when considering the philosophical positions held to originate in Thales "in reality these stem directly from Aristotle's own interpretations which then became incorporated in the doxographical tradition as erroneous ascriptions to Thales". (The same treatment was given by Aristotle to Anaxagoras.)

Most philosophic analyses of the philosophy of Thales come from Aristotle, a professional philosopher, tutor of Alexander the Great, who wrote 200 years after Thales' death. Aristotle, judging from his surviving books, does not seem to have access to any works by Thales, although he probably had access to works of other authors about Thales, such as Herodotus, Hecataeus, Plato etc., as well as others whose work is now extinct. It was Aristotle's express goal to present Thales' work not because it was significant in itself, but as a prelude to his own work in natural philosophy. Geoffrey Kirk and John Raven, English compilers of the fragments of the Pre-Socratics, assert that Aristotle's "judgments are often distorted by his view of earlier philosophy as a stumbling progress toward the truth that Aristotle himself revealed in his physical doctrines." There was also an extensive oral tradition. Both the oral and the written were commonly read or known by all educated men in the region.

Aristotle's philosophy had a distinct stamp: it professed the theory of matter and form, which modern scholastics have dubbed hylomorphism. Though once very widespread, it was not generally adopted by rationalist and modern science, as it mainly is useful in metaphysical analyses, but does not lend itself to the detail that is of interest to modern science. It is not clear that the theory of matter and form existed as early as Thales, and if it did, whether Thales espoused it.

While some historians, like B. Snell, maintain that Aristotle was relying on a pre-Platonic written record by Hippias rather than oral tradition, this is a controversial position. Representing the scholarly consensus Dicks states that "the tradition about him even as early as the fifth century B.C., was evidently based entirely on hearsay....It would seem that already by Aristotle's time the early Ionians were largely names only to which popular tradition attached various ideas or achievements with greater or less plausibility". He points out that works confirmed to have existed in the sixth century BC by Anaximander and Xenophanes had already disappeared by the fourth century BC, so the chances of Pre-Socratic material surviving to the age of Aristotle is almost nil (even less likely for Aristotle's pupils Theophrastus and Eudemus and less likely still for those following after them).

Diogenes Laërtius
The main secondary source concerning the details of Thales' life and career is Diogenes Laërtius, "Lives of Eminent Philosophers". This is primarily a biographical work, as the name indicates. Compared to Aristotle, Diogenes is not much of a philosopher. He is the one who, in the Prologue to that work, is responsible for the division of the early philosophers into "Ionian" and "Italian", but he places the Academics in the Ionian school and otherwise evidences considerable disarray and contradiction, especially in the long section on forerunners of the "Ionian School". Diogenes quotes two letters attributed to Thales, but Diogenes wrote some eight centuries after Thales' death and that his sources often contained "unreliable or even fabricated information", hence the concern for separating fact from legend in accounts of Thales.

It is due to this use of hearsay and a lack of citing original sources that leads some historians, like Dicks and Werner Jaeger, to look at the late origin of the traditional picture of Pre-Socratic philosophy and view the whole idea as a construct from a later age, "the whole picture that has come down to us of the history of early philosophy was fashioned during the two or three generations from Plato to the immediate pupils of Aristotle".

See also 
 Know thyself
 Material monism
 Plato's Academy mosaic

Notes

References 
  (1991 pbk ed. ; 2011 3rd edition)
  Third Edition
 
 Herodotus, Histories, A. D. Godley (translator), Cambridge: Harvard University Press, 1920; . Online version at Perseus
 Hans Joachim Störig, Kleine Weltgeschichte der Philosophie. Fischer, Frankfurt/M. 2004, .
 
 
 Pliny the Elder, The Natural History (eds. John Bostock, M.D., F.R.S. H.T. Riley, Esq., B.A.) London. Taylor and Francis. (1855). Online version at the Perseus Digital Library.

Further reading 
 
  
 
 
 Priou, Alex (2016). "The Origin and Foundations of Milesian Thought." The Review of Metaphysics 70, 3–31.

External links 

 Thales of Miletus from The Internet Encyclopedia of Philosophy
 Thales of Miletus MacTutor History of Mathematics
 Thales' Theorem – Math Open Reference (with interactive animation)
 Thales biography by Charlene Douglass (with extensive bibliography)
 Thales of Miletus Life, Work and Testimonies by Giannis Stamatellos
 Thales Fragments

6th-century BC Greek people
6th-century BC philosophers
620s BC births
540s BC deaths
Ancient Greek astronomers
Ancient Greek geometers
Ancient Greek metaphysicians
Ancient Greek physicists
Ancient Milesians
Epistemologists
Metaphilosophers
Metaphysicians
Metaphysics writers
Natural philosophers
Ontologists
Philosophers of ancient Ionia
Philosophers of education
Philosophers of mathematics
Philosophers of mind
Philosophers of science
Presocratic philosophers
Seven Sages of Greece
6th-century BC mathematicians
6th-century BC astronomers